Charles Peter Wagner (August 15, 1930 – October 21, 2016) was an American missionary, writer, teacher and founder of several Christian organizations. In his earlier years, Wagner was known as a key leader of the Church Growth Movement and later for his writings on spiritual warfare.

Biography 
Wagner served as a missionary in Bolivia under the South American Mission and Andes Evangelical Mission (now SIM International) from 1956 to 1971. He then served for 30 years (1971 to 2001) as Professor of Church Growth at the Fuller Theological Seminary's School of World Missions until his retirement in 2001. During his time at Fuller, Peter was largely recognized as the leading authority on the Church Growth Movement after his mentor and the founder of the movement, Donald McGavran passed the succession to him. The acceptance of Peter’s teachings on church growth by churches across the world was due in part to the use of Fuller Theological Seminary as a platform to spreading the message. Together, both McGavran and Wagner lead the Fuller Evangelistic Association to continue to spread the message of church growth.

He authored 80 books and was the founding president of Global Harvest Ministries from 1993 to 2011 and founder and chancellor emeritus of Wagner Leadership Institute (now Wagner University), an unaccredited institution which trains revivalists and reformers to bring about a global movement of transformation. He also founded Reformation Prayer Network, International Coalition of Apostles, Eagles Vision Apostolic Team, and the Hamilton Group and served as vice president of Global Spheres, Inc.

He died in 2016 at the age of 86.

Theology

Spiritual warfare 
Wagner wrote about spiritual warfare, in books including Confronting the Powers: How the New Testament Church Experienced the Power of Strategic-Level Spiritual Warfare and Engaging the Enemy. In Confronting the Powers, Wagner breaks down spiritual warfare as having three levels: "Ground Level: Person-to-person, praying for each other's personal needs. Occult Level: deals with demonic forces released through activities related to Satanism, witchcraft, astrology and many other forms of structured occultism. Strategic-Level or Cosmic-Level: To bind and bring down spiritual principalities and powers that rule over governments." "Strategic-level intercession" uses "spiritual mapping" and "tearing down strongholds" to engage in spiritual warfare against "territorial spirits".

According to Wagner, these methods "were virtually unknown to the majority of Christians before the 1990s”. The premise of Engaging the Enemy is that Satan and his demons are literally in the world, that Satan's territorial spirit-demons may be identified by name, and that Christians are to engage in spiritual warfare with them.

Wagner preached a fivefold ministry view based on Ephesians 4:13, in which apostles, prophets, evangelists, pastors, and teachers are considered legitimate offices of the church. While mainline Protestant denominations see prophets and apostles as dispensed of within the early period of Christianity, Wagner's spiritual-warfare theology depicted these figures as prayer-warriors actively interceding in the contemporary world. These prayer warriors are responsible for ushering in the return of Jesus and the Kingdom of God through warfare prayer.

In Hard-Core Idolatry: Facing the Facts, Wagner asserted that idolizing Catholic saints brings honor to the spirits of darkness, and promotes the burning of their statues in Argentina. Wagner asserted that the Holy Spirit came to his associate, Cindy Jacobs (a prophet in Wagner's Apostolic Council of Prophetic Elders) and "told her that in [the Argentinian city of] Resistencia they need to burn the idols, like the magicians did in Ephesus in Acts of the Apostles".

New Apostolic Reformation 
Wagner used the term New Apostolic Reformation (NAR) to describe what he observed as a movement within Pentecostal and charismatic churches. The title is not an organization and does not have formal membership.

Wagner stated, "The roots of the NAR go back to the beginning of the African Independent Church Movement in 1900, the Chinese House Church Movement beginning in 1976, the U.S. Independent Charismatic Movement beginning in the 1970s and the Latin American Grassroots Church Movement beginning around the same time. I was neither the founder nor a member of any of these movements, I was simply a professor who observed that they were the fastest growing churches in their respective regions and that they had a number of common characteristics."

Dr. Roger Olson writes, “…the closer I looked at the NARM [New Apostolic Reformation Movement] the less convinced I was that it is a cohesive movement at all. It seems more like a kind of umbrella term for a loose collection of independent ministries that have a few common interests...I have examined the web sites of several independent evangelists who claim to represent that affinity...So far none of them seem blatantly heretical. Eccentric, non-mainline, a bit fanatical, maybe.” Another term coined by Wagner is the Third Wave of the Holy Spirit. The NAR includes key elements of the Third Wave such as claims of miraculous healing.

Wagner provided the key differences between the NAR and traditional Protestantism in his article The New Apostolic Reformation Is Not a Cult. He noted that those participating in the movement believe the Apostles’ Creed and adhere to orthodox Christian doctrine.

Seven Mountains Dominionism 
In his 1998 book Churchquake!, Wagner denied that NAR had any political orientation. Ten years later he published Dominion!, an endorsement of Dominion Theology.

Selected works
Latin American Theology. Radical or Evangelical, Eerdmans, 1970.
Your Spiritual Gifts Can Help Your Church Grow, Regal Books, 1979, 1994, 2005. 
Strategies for Church Growth, Regal Books, 1987. 
How to Have a Healing Ministry, Regal Books, 1988. 
The New Apostolic Churches, Regal Books, 1998 
Churchquake!, Regal Books, 1999. 
Changing Church, Regal Books, 2004. 
Breaking Strongholds in Your City, Regal Books, 1993. 
Freedom from the Religious Spirit, Regal Books, 2005. 
Engaging the Enemy, Regal Books, 1991.
Prayer Warrior Series, Regal Books, 1992–1997.
Warfare Prayer: How to Seek God's Power and Protection in the Battle to Build His Kingdom 
 Prayer shield: How to intercede for pastors, Christian leaders, and others on the spiritual frontlines 
 Confronting the Powers: How the New Testament Church Experienced the Power of Strategic-Level Spiritual Warfare 
 Praying With Power : How to Pray Effectively and Hear Clearly from God 
Dominion:How Kingdom Action Can Change the World, Chosen Books, 2008. 
The Book Of Acts: A Commentary, Regal Books, 2008.

Sources
 George M. Marsden, Reforming Fundamentalism: Fuller Seminary and the New Evangelicalism (Grand Rapids: William B. Eerdmans, 1987), pp. 292–295.

References

1930 births
2016 deaths
20th-century evangelicals
21st-century evangelicals
American Christian writers
American evangelicals
American expatriates in Bolivia
American male non-fiction writers
American Pentecostal missionaries
Christian missionaries in Bolivia
Fuller Theological Seminary faculty
Missiologists
Spiritual warfare
Place of birth missing